Acanthogeophilus is a genus of soil centipedes in the family Geophilidae, found in the centro-west part of the Mediterranean region. The species in this genus are slender, 2-3 centimeters long, with between 67-71 pairs of stout legs, peculiar spine-like processes on the ultimate legs, a claw-like pretarsus, complete coxo-pleural sutures, incomplete chitin-lines, absence of a carpophagous pit, possession of only basal denticles, and a transverse band porefield with scattered, anterior pores on the coxopleuron.

The genus contains the following species:
Acanthogeophilus dentifer Minelli, 1982
Acanthogeophilus spiniger (Meinert, 1870)

References 

Centipede genera
Geophilidae